The 2019 College Nationals was the 24th Men's College Nationals.  The College Nationals was a team handball tournament to determine the College National Champion from 2019 from the US.

Venues
The championship was played at two venues at the University of North Carolina at Chapel Hill in Chapel Hill, North Carolina.

Draw

The seeding was based on the USA Men's Top 5 College Rankings from March.

The 4th ranked team West Virginia University was not able to play at the college nationals. Because of there finals.

Seeding

(NR=Not ranked; NV=No votes)

The two teams of pot 1 and 5 were placed in group A the team in pot 3 in group B.

The other teams were placed in group A or B.

Modus
The seven teams are split in two groups A (4 teams) and B and will play first a round robin. 2 × 25 min game time.

The first of group A have a bye in the quarterfinals. All others play a quarterfinal. 2 × 25 min game time.

The winners of the quarterfinals plays the semis.  2 × 30 min game time. 2 × 25 min game time.

The three losers of the quarters plays a round robin for the places seven to five. 2 × 25 min game time.

The losers of the semis play a small final. 2 × 30 min game time.

The winners of the semis play the final. 2 × 30 min game time.

Results

Group stage

Group A

Group B

Championship

Quarterfinals

Semifinals

Small Final

Final

Placement Games

Final ranking

Awards
Source:

References

External links
 Competition Page
 Second Page

USA Team Handball College Nationals by year
North Carolina Tar Heels team handball